Warlimpirrnga Tjapaltjarri (born late 1950s) is an Australian Aboriginal artist. He is one of central Australia's most well-known indigenous artists.

Early life

Tjapaltjarri was born in the late 1950s, near Lake Mackay, east of where Kiwirrkurra is today. His family were Pintupi hunter-gatherers who lived a traditional nomadic way of life on the western side of the lake, and had never come into contact with Euro-Australian society. Tjapaltjarri's father died when he was a young boy, and his mother remarried shortly after. Tjapaltjarri himself married his cousin, Yalti, sometime around 1980. He served the family's main provider of food, hunting with spears, mirru (spear-throwers) and boomerangs.

In 1984, when Tjapaltjarri was about 25, he finally came into contact people from outside his family. Upon seeing a white man for the first time, Tjapaltjarri remembers, "I couldn't believe it. I thought he was a devil, a bad spirit. He was the colour of clouds at sunrise." A few days later, he and his family were settled at Kiwirrkurra. News of this group living nomadically so far into the modern world made headlines internationally.

Painting
Tjapaltjarri started painting in 1987, working with Papunya Tula. Initially practising under the tutelage of other artists at the company, he finished his first painting for them in April 1987. His first public exhibition was in Melbourne, the following year. It showed eleven of his paintings, all of which were bought for the National Gallery of Victoria. He has since become one of central Australia's most well-known artists.

Tjapaltjarri paints abstract images of sacred stories and songs from his family's Dreaming. The stories focus around the Tingari, the ancestors of the Pintupi, spirit beings who are believed to have created all living things. His stories are about his country and sacred sites such as Marruwa and Kanapilya.

His work is held in several major public collections across Australia, such as in the National Gallery in Canberra, the Art Gallery of New South Wales, and the National Gallery of Victoria. He also has work in galleries overseas, such as the Quai Branly Museum in Paris, and the Kluge-Ruhe Aboriginal Art Collection at the University of Virginia. In 2012, his work was shown as part of the documenta exhibition in Kassel, Germany.

In September 2016, one of his paintings sold for £167,000 at Sotheby's in London, and in October 2016, he had his first solo exhibition in the United States, at the Salon 94 gallery in New York City.

In March 2019, the Netflix series After Life, made by Ricky Gervais, featured a copy of one of Tjapaltjarri's paintings which had been made by an artist commissioned to do so for a props company in 1999. Gervais' company agreed to pay compensation for using the copy of the work, a 1987 work entitled Tingarri Dreaming, as well as a fee for use of the work in season two of the series.

References

Other websites
Warlimpirrnga Tjapaltjarri at Design and Art Australia Online
Works by Warlimpirrnga Tjapaltjarri at the Art Gallery of New South Wales
Works by Warlimpirrnga Tjapaltjarri at the National Gallery of Victoria

Australian Aboriginal artists
Indigenous Australians from Western Australia
Living people
Australian painters
1950s births
Pintupi